The 2000–01 Eastern Michigan Eagles men's basketball team represented Eastern Michigan University during the 2000–01 NCAA Division I men's basketball season. The Eagles, led by 1st year head coach Jim Boone. The Eagles played their home games at the Eastern Michigan University Convocation Center and were members of the West Division of the Mid-American Conference. They finished the season 3–25, 1–17 in MAC play. They finished 6th in the MAC West. They were knocked out in the first round of the MAC Tournament by the Toledo Rockets.

Roster
Source:

The team captains were Mosi Barnes, C.J. Grantham, and Steve Pettyjohn.

Roster Changes 
Additions
 G Ricky Cottrill (FR)
 F Shamar Herron (JR)
 G Ryan Hopkins (FR)
 C Nats Nordin (FR)
Departures
 F Craig Erquhart (Graduated)
 G Larry Fisher (Graduated)
 G Antonio Gates (Transfer to Kent State)
 G Desean Hadley (Graduated)
 G/F Adam Hess (Transfer to William & Mary)
 G Avin Howard
 C Solomon Mcgee (Graduated)
 G Corey Tarrant (Graduated)
 F Calvin Warner (transfer to Jacksonville)

Schedule 

|-
!colspan=9| Regular Season

|-
!colspan=9| 2001 MAC men's basketball tournament

Season Highlights

11/29 vs Green Bay 
 Tyson Radney sets Convocation Center record with 19 rebounds in a game and with 13 rebounds in the first half.

12/06 vs IUPUI 
 Melvin Hicks scores a career high 22 points. 
 Jim Boone's first win as Eastern Michigan head coach.

02/07 vs Western Michigan 
 Melvin Hicks was named Kraft player of the game.

References

Eastern Michigan Eagles men's basketball seasons
Eastern Michigan
Eastern Michigan Eagles Men's Basketball
Eastern Michigan Eagles Men's Basketball